The 1992 European Weightlifting Championships were held in Szekszárd, Hungary from April 21 to April 26, 1992. It was the 71st edition of the event. There were a total number of 149 athletes competing, from 30 nations. The women competition were held in Loures, Portugal. It was the 5th event for the women.

Medal summary

Men

Medals tables 
Ranking by Big (Total result) medals

References
Weightlifting Database

European Weightlifting Championships
European Weightlifting Championships
European Weightlifting Championships
International weightlifting competitions hosted by Hungary